Green Bay–Austin Straubel International Airport  is a county-owned public-use airport in Brown County, Wisconsin, United States, which serves Northeastern Wisconsin. It is the fourth busiest of eight commercial service airports in Wisconsin in terms of passengers served. It is included in the Federal Aviation Administration (FAA) National Plan of Integrated Airport Systems for 2023–2027, in which it is categorized as a non-hub primary commercial service facility.
The airport sits on portions of land encompassing Green Bay and the Oneida Nation of Wisconsin's Indian reservation. It has two runways and is used for commercial air travel and general aviation. There are two concourses with six gates each. The airport is named for Lt. Col. Austin Straubel, the first aviator from Brown County to die in his country's service on February 3, 1942, after having served for thirteen years in the United States Army Air Corps. The airport name was officially changed to Green Bay–Austin Straubel International Airport on August 17, 2016.

Green Bay–Austin Straubel International Airport is also known as "The Gateway to Lambeau", as it is the primary airport utilized for people and teams traveling to Lambeau Field, home of the Green Bay Packers.

Facilities
Green Bay–Austin Straubel International Airport has two fixed-base operators: Executive Air and Jet Air. Both offer full service during operating hours.

 Runway 18/36: 8,700 x 150 ft (2,651 x 46 m.), surface: concrete, ILS equipped
 Runway 6/24: 7,700 x 150 ft (2,347 x 46 m.), surface: concrete, ILS/DME equipped

For the twelve-month period ending December 31, 2021, the airport had 38,152 aircraft operations, an average of 105 per day: 62% general aviation, 19% air taxi, 17% commercial airline and 2% military.

Airlines and destinations

Passenger

Cargo

Statistics

Top destinations

Passenger traffic

Airline market share

Accidents and incidents
On June 29, 1972, a Convair CV-580 flying as, North Central Airlines Flight 290 bound for Oshkosh, Milwaukee and Chicago collided midair with an Air Wisconsin turboprop plane over Lake Winnebago. Eight people died as a result of this accident, five from the North Central flight and three from the Air Wisconsin plane.
On December 21, 1979, a Cessna 310R operated by Green Bay Aviation was destroyed and two of the five occupants were killed when the aircraft struck trees. The accident occurred 1/2 mile southwest of the airport as the aircraft was executing an ILS approach to Runway 6.
On January 25, 1989, a privately owned Cessna 337G was destroyed when it impacted the ground 1/2 mile south of Austin Straubel Airport. The aircraft was on approach to GRB, where it was based when the crash occurred. The plane's only occupant, the pilot, was killed.
On April 2, 2001, a Cessna 501 I/SP en route to Fort Myers, Florida crashed into a Morning Glory Dairy warehouse immediately after takeoff from Runway 18, killing the sole occupant of the aircraft.
On May 16, 2001, a Glasair experimental aircraft was destroyed and the pilot killed.  The aircraft, which was based at GRB, impacted the ground while executing a turn for separation with a landing Cessna on runway 24 at GRB.
On February 22, 2018, a Cessna 441 performing a flight from Indianapolis to Green Bay crashed in Carroll County, Indiana. All three occupants on board were killed.

See also
 Green Bay Metro
 List of airports in Wisconsin
 List of intercity bus stops in Wisconsin

References

External links
 
  at Wisconsin DOT airport directory
 
 

Airports in Wisconsin
Buildings and structures in Brown County, Wisconsin